, known professionally as , is a Japanese actress, presenter, and former gravure idol. She is known for playing the lead role in NHK's drama Honjitsu wa Taian Nari and presenting the TBS variety show Ōsama no Brunch. From 1999 to 2001, she received the Golden Arrow Award every year. In 2003, she was given both a Golden Graph Award and the Japan Academy Prize for Best Newcomer.

Appearances

Films 
 Koi ni Utaeba (2002), Yumi Sakurai
 Boku no Songokū (2003), Songokū
 Reincarnation (2005), Nagisa Sugiura
 Taishibōkei Tanita no Shain Shokudō (2013), Nanako Haruno
 Black Butler (2014), Hanae Wakatsuki
 Akumu-chan (2014), Kotoha Hirashima
 Wood Job! (2014), Miki Īda
 Galaxy Turnpike (2015), Rei
 Jinsei no Yakusoku (2016), Yukiko Ōba
 The Blue Hearts (2017)
 Gokko (2017)
 Hitsuji no Ki (2018), Rieko Ōta
 You Shine in the Moonlit Night (2019)

TV dramas
 Ao no Jidai (TBS, 1998), Yuka
 The Sun Never Sets (Fuji TV, 2000), Ami Isetani
 20-sai no Kekkon (TBS, 2000), Renko Chūganji
 Love Story (TBS, 2001), Kano Kobayashi
 Zoku Heisei Fūfu Jawan (NTV, 2002)
 Yūkaza Cinema (TV Asahi, 2002)
 Yonimo Kimyō na Monogatari: Dramatic Syndrome (Fuji TV, 2001)
 Honto ni Atta Kowai Hanashi 3 (Fuji TV, 2003)
 Taiga drama Shinsengumi! (NHK, 2004)
 Yonimo Kimyō na Monogatari: Aketekure (Fuji TV, 2004)
 Hoshi ni Negai o: 7jōma de Umareta 410-man no Hoshi (Fuji TV, 2005), Yōko Satō
 Renai Shōsetsu "Duke" (TBS, 2006), Kōko Tachibana
 24-jikan Terebi Ai wa Chikyū o Sukuu "Yūki" (NTV, 2006), Yoshie
 Oishinbo (Fuji TV, 2007-2009), Yūko Kurita
 Maru Maru Chibi Maruko Chan Episode 3 (Fuji TV, 2007)
 Shinjitsu no Shuki BC Kyū Senpan Katō Tetsutarō "Watashi wa Kai ni Naritai" (NTV, 2007), Fujiko Katō
 Gout Temps Nouveau (KTV, 2007), Yūka Tanaka
 Maō Episode 4-7 (TBS, 2008), Makiko Naruse
 Koi no Karasawagi: Love Stories V "Sōgiya no Onna" (NTV, 2008), Yuri Honda
 Kochira Katsushika-ku Kameari Kōen-mae Hashutsujo Episode 8 (TBS, 2009), Teacher Izumi
 My Girl (TV Asahi, 2009), Yōko Tsukamoto
 Bungō: Nihon Bungaku Cinema "Ōgon Fūkei" (TBS, 2010), Okei
 Kono Sekai no Katasumi ni (NTV, 2011)
 T-UP presents Thumbs Up! (BS Fuji, 2011), Hana
 Honjitsu wa Taian Nari (NHK, 2012), Takako Yamai
 Papadol! (TBS, 2012), Haruka Hanamura
 Akumu-chan (NTV, 2012), Kotoha Hirashima
 Hakuba no Ōji-sama (NTV, 2013), Takako Hara
 Hell Teacher Nūbē (NTV, 2014), Minako
 Carolling: Christmas no Kiseki (NHK BS, 2014), Sūko Orihara
 Taiga drama Hana Moyu (NHK, 2015), Sugihisa
 Chikaemon (NHK, 2016), Osode
 Rinshō Hanzai Gakusha Himura Hideo no Suiri (NTV, 2016), Nozomi Ono
 Hi no Ko (Tōkai TV, 2016), Yukimi Kajima
 Hitoshi Ueki and Nobosemon (NHK, 2017), Tomiko
 Ieyasu, Edo wo Tateru (NHK, 2019)

Dubbing
 Bunshinsaba (2004), Lee Yoo-jin
 Ice Age: The Meltdown (2006), Ellie
 Strings (2007), Jhinna

Bibliography

Books
 Hirune no Honne (Kadokawa Shoten, October 2000) 
 Air (Shogakukan, June 2002)

Photobooks
 ZIP (Eichi Shuppan, April 1998) 
 Vim with Rei Yoshii (Eichi Shuppan, April 1998) 
 Sirena (TIS, 1998) 
 Perfume (Wani Books, April 1999) 
 Yūka CF Special Carat (Futabasha, July 2000) 
 Innocent Yūka (Shueisha, April 2000) 
 Memories of Innocent Yūka (Shueisha, May 2000) 
 Koi ni Utaeba (Kadokawa Shoten, October 2002) 
 Yūka Body (Kodansha, March 2012) 
 Yūka Gravure (Kodansha, March 2012) 
 Yūka Gravure Tokusōban (Kodansha, March 2012)

Awards

 The 36th Golden Arrow Award: Graph Award (1999)
 The 37th Golden Arrow Award: Best Newcomer and Newcomer for Broadcasting Award (2000)
 The 38th Golden Arrow Award: Broadcasting Award (2001)
 The 26th Japan Academy Prize: Best Newcomer (2003)
 The 40th Golden Arrow Award: Golden Graph Award (2003)

References

External links
  
 

Japanese gravure idols
1980 births
Actresses from Tokyo
Japanese television personalities
Living people
Horipro artists